Not Reachable is a 2022 Indian Tamil-language crime thriller film directed by Chandru Muruganantham and written by Chandru Muruganantham . The film was under Production House  Crackbrain Productions. The film stars Vishwa with Sai Dhanya,Vijayan, Subha Devaraj and Birla Bose in supporting roles. The film was released in theatres on 9 September 2022.

Cast 
Vishwa - Vishwa
Sai Dhanya - Hema
Vijayan - Raghu 
Subha Devaraj - Kayal
Kadhal Saravanan - Kalyanam
Birla Bose - Kumaravel

Release 
The film had a theatrical release on 9 September 2022.  A critic from Maalai Malar gave the film a mixed review. and  a critic from Dina Thanthi also gave the film a mixed review.

References 

2020s Tamil-language films